The Tsleil-Waututh Nation, formerly known as the Burrard Indian Band or Burrard Inlet Indian Band, is a First Nations band government in the Canadian province of British Columbia.

The TWN is a member government of the Naut'sa mawt Tribal Council, which includes other governments on the upper Sunshine Coast, southeastern Vancouver Island and the Tsawwassen band on the other side of the Vancouver metropolis from the Tsleil-waututh. There are almost 600 members with 287 living on the reserve as of January 2018.

According to the 2011 national Community Well Being Index, Burrard Inlet 3 is considered the most prosperous First Nation community in Canada.

Notable members
The most famous member of the TWN was Chief Dan George, an actor and native rights advocate best known for his role as Old Lodge Skins in Little Big Man, The Outlaw Josey Wales and for another role as Old Antoine in the Canadian Broadcasting Corporation television series Cariboo Country (based on books by Paul St. Pierre). His descendants still figure prominently in TWN government and culture. The TWN is also known for its war canoe racing team, The Burrard Canoe Club.

Hereditary Chief John L. George was the longest serving elected Chief and founding member of the Union of BC Indian Chiefs, formed in 1969 against the Liberal 'White Paper' Policy that would end Indian status. He was a strong advocate and protector of TWN Aboriginal Rights and Title. Leonard H. George was an elected Chief and created the TWN Takaya Developments and began the partnerships that have brought much real estate development to TWN. Leonard also brought TWN into the BC Treaty Process and was a strong voice for the TWN. As well, he is the son of Chief Dan George and was a successful actor as well as being a politician.

The TWN operates an ocean-going canoe tour/experience known as Takaya Tours https://takayatours.com

Reserves

Indian Reserves under the administration of the Squamish Nation are:

Burrard Inlet 3, on north shore of Burrard Inlet, in District of North Vancouver, Main Reserve of the Nation, 108.2 ha. 
Inlailwatash 4, about 1 km upstream from mouth of Indian River, 19 km North-Northeast of Burrand Inlet 3 Reserve, 0.5 ha. 
Inlailwatash 4A, about 1.3 km upstream from mouth of Indian River, 19 km North-Northeast of Burrand Inlet 3 Reserve, 2 ha.

Documentary and Notable Events
In 2006, a documentary followed and was filmed by four Tsleil-Waututh youth to highlight their struggles with the education system. The documentary — titled as Reds, Whites & the Blues and/or, Reading, Writing & the Rez — is a CBC Newsworld in-house production co-produced with CBUT.

In 2010 TWN helped welcome the Vancouver 2010 Winter Olympics as part of the Four Host First Nations, which included Musqueam, Squamish and Lil'wat Nations. It was the first time that Canada accommodated the Indigenous nations interest for the event. It was the first time Indigenous title holders were recognized by the Olympic body.

The TWN is also opposed to the Trans Mountain Expansion Project and their views and scientific reports can be found at the Sacred Trust Initiative:  https://twnsacredtrust.ca

See also
 Squamish Nation
 Coast Salish peoples
 Dan George
 History of Squamish and Tsleil-Waututh Longshoremen, 1863-1963

References

 
Coast Salish governments
First Nations governments in the Lower Mainland